Darryl King (6 June 1942 – 3 March 2002) was an Australian cricketer. He played in eight first-class matches for Queensland between 1962 and 1967.

See also
 List of Queensland first-class cricketers

References

External links
 

1942 births
2002 deaths
Australian cricketers
Queensland cricketers
Cricketers from Brisbane